Algorithmic may refer to:
Algorithm, step-by-step instructions for a calculation
Algorithmic art, art made by an algorithm
Algorithmic composition, music made by an algorithm
Algorithmic trading, trading decisions made by an algorithm
Algorithmic patent, an intellectual property right in an algorithm
Algorithmics, the science of algorithms
Algorithmica, an academic journal for algorithm research
Algorithmic efficiency, the computational resources used by an algorithm
Algorithmic information theory, study of relationships between computation and information
Algorithmic mechanism design, the design of economic systems from an algorithmic point of view
Algorithmic number theory, algorithms for number-theoretic computation
Algorithmic game theory, game-theoretic techniques for algorithm design and analysis
Algorithmic cooling, a phenomenon in quantum computation
Algorithmic probability, a universal choice of prior probabilities in Solomonoff's theory of inductive inference

See also
Algorithmic complexity (disambiguation)